Tobias Oliver (born June 22, 1999) is an American football cornerback. He played college football at Georgia Tech.

Early years 
Oliver attended Northside High School. He was a three year starter and team captain. He played football and basketball. Oliver was rated as a three-star prospect by 247Sports.com, Rivals.com and Scout.com. He helped lead his team to a state championship as a sophomore in 2014 and an appearance in the state semifinals as a senior in 2016. Oliver amassed 3,785 passing yards and 3,218 rushing yards during his time at Northside. While at Northside, he was rivals with Jake Fromm, who played at Houston County High School.

College career 
He began his college career as a quarterback.

During his redshirt freshman season in 2018, Oliver appeared in 12 games. On October 25 at Virginia Tech, Oliver started his first game in a 49–28 victory for Georgia Tech. Oliver's next start was on August 29 against No. 1 Clemson.

In 2019, he switched to wide receiver, and in 2020, switched again to cornerback.

In December 2021, he announced he would enter the 2022 NFL Draft.

Professional career 
In May 2022, he was invited to minicamp with the New York Giants.

See also 

 List of Georgia Tech Yellow Jackets starting quarterbacks
 Georgia Tech Yellow Jackets football statistical leaders

References

External links 
Tobias Oliver College Stats

American football quarterbacks
1999 births
Living people
Georgia Tech Yellow Jackets football players